Park Kyung-hye ( born on 5 January 1993) is a South Korean actress. She made her acting debut in 2011 in films, since then, she has appeared in number of films and television series. She got recognition for her supporting roles in Guardian: The Lonely and Great God (2016), Touch Your Heart, Miss Lee (2019) and My Roommate Is a Gumiho (2021). She has acted in films such as: The Dude in Me (2019), Escape from Mogadishu (2021), and Limit (2022) among others.

Career
Park Kyung-hye is affiliated to artist management company Big Boss Entertainment. Park made her debut in film Ad Balloon in 2011, then she appeared in small roles in films. Her break through came in TV series in 2014. She appeared in Cunning Single Lady (2014), Guardian: The Lonely and Great God (2016), Heart Surgeons (2018) and Touch Your Heart (2019).

In July 2022, Park signed with C-JeS Entertainment.

Filmography

Films

Television series

References

External links

 
 
 Park Kyung-hye on Daum 

21st-century South Korean actresses
South Korean film actresses
South Korean television actresses
Living people
1993 births
People from Seoul
Actresses from Seoul